The 2017 Penn Quakers football team represented the University of Pennsylvania during the 2017 NCAA Division I FCS football season. They were led by third-year head coach Ray Priore. They played their home games at Franklin Field. They are a member of the Ivy League. They finished the season 6–4 overall and 4–3 in Ivy League play to place fourth . Penn averaged 5,274 fans per game.

Schedule
The 2017 schedule consisted of five home and five away games. The Quakers hosted Ivy League foes Dartmouth, Yale, Princeton, and Cornell, and traveled to Columbia, Brown, and Harvard. Homecoming coincided with the game against Princeton on November 4.

In 2017, Penn's non-conference opponents were Ohio Dominican of the Great Midwest Athletic Conference (Division II), Lehigh of the Patriot League and Central Connecticut of the Northeast Conference.

Game summaries

Ohio Dominican

Lehigh

Dartmouth

Central Connecticut

Columbia

Yale

Brown

Princeton

Harvard

Cornell

2018 NFL Draft

References

Penn
Penn Quakers football seasons
Penn Quakers football